Tyron is a given name:

 Tyron Brackenridge (born 1984), Canadian football defensive backs coach
 Tyron Carrier (born 1987), American athlete who was formerly a wide receiver
 Tyron Frampton (born 1994), British rapper better known as Slowthai
 Tyron Henderson (born 1974), South African professional cricketer
 Tyron Ivanof (born 1997), Belgian footballer
 Tyron Johnson (born 1996), American football player
 Tyron Koen (born 1997), South African cricketer
 Tyron Leitso (born 1976), Canadian actor
 Tyron McCoy (born 1972), American professional basketball coach, and former professional basketball player
 Tyron Perez (1985–2011), Filipino model, actor and television host
 Tyron Silvapulle (1986-1999), Sri Lankan pilot
 Tyron Smith (born 1990), American football offensive tackle
 Tyron Uy (born 1985), Filipino politician
 Tyron Wijewardene (born 1961), former Sri Lankan cricketer and current cricket umpire
 Tyron Woodley (born 1982), American professional mixed martial artist, rapper, broadcast analyst, and former UFC Welterweight Champion
 Tyron Zeuge (born 1992), German professional boxer

See also 
 Tyron (album), by Slowthai, 2021
 Tryon (disambiguation)
 Tyrone (name)